The Noctis Valkyries Metal Festival was a Canadian music festival started in Calgary, Alberta. Held annually from 2007 until 2013, the metal festival was organized by Scarab Metal Productions.

Festival dates and lineups

2007: Noctis Valkyries
September 22, 2007
MacEwan Hall Ballroom

Melechesh
Inquisition
Infernäl Mäjesty
Dark Forest
Wolves in the Throne Room
Insidious Omen
Norrath
Lords of the Mountain
Wargod

2008: Noctis II - Age of Darkness
October 4, 2008
MacEwan Hall Ballroom

Korpiklaani
Woods of Ypres
Ahab
Verbal Deception
Dark Forest
Begrime Exemious
Urheimat

2009: Noctis III - Tritagonist

October 2 & October 3, 2009

October 2nd
The Distillery (Club Night)

Novembers Doom
Slough Feg
Ares Kingdom
Kilyakai
Norrath
Tosca
Truck

Live Interviews

Martin Popoff - Brave Words & Bloody Knuckles
Paul Masvidal and Sean Reinert - Cynic
Paul Kuhr and members of Novembers Doom
Michael Scalzi and members of Slough Feg
Chuck Keller and members of Ares Kingdom

Guest Speakers, Panels, and Q&A

Michael Faley - President of Metal Blade Records
Michael Berberian - President and CEO of Season of Mist France
EJ Johangton - President of Prosthetic Records USA
Dan Rozenblum - Thunderdome Touring
David Gold - Woods of Ypres
Mira Born - Freelance photographer, Netherlands
Josh Hogan - Diminished Fifth Records Halifax
Sacha Laskow - Divinity
Greg Musgrave - Exit Strategy, Phantom Limb
Therese Lanz - Ex-Exit Strategy, Kilbourne, Mares of Thrace
Derek Orthner - Begrime Exemious
Tomislav Crnkovic - Viathyn, Axe Music
Pamela Porosky
James Stangroom - Freelance Photographer, Calgary
Joshua Wood - Co-Host Megawatt Mayhem
Kevin Woron - Co-Host Megawatt Mayhem

October 3
MacEwan Hall (Main Stage)

Cynic
Suffocation
Deströyer 666
Aura Noir
Exit Strategy
Begrime Exemious

The Den U of C (Second Stage)

Death Toll Rising
Sacred Ally
Akakor
A Bloodshed Nightmare
Hrom
Fornication

2010: Noctis IV - Thrones of War
September 24 & September 25, 2010
September 24
MacEwan Hall

Rotten Sound
Incantation (band)
Manegarm
Root (band)
Viathyn
Ominosity

Live Interviews

Martin Popoff - Brave Words & Bloody Knuckles
Tom 'Angelripper' - Sodom
Martin Atkins - Author of Tour:Smart

Guest Speakers, Panels, and Q&A

Mira Born - Freelance photographer, Netherlands
Jon Asher - Publicist, Asher Media Relations
Craig Boychuk - Recording Engineer
Tyson Boyd - Alberta Music Industry Association
Chris Bruni - Profound Lore Records
Ian Christie - Author, Sound of the Beast: The Complete Headbanging History of Heavy Metal
Topon Das - Fuck the Facts
Tomislav Crnkovic - Viathyn, Axe Music
Sam Dunn - Music Anthropologist Metal: A Headbanger's Journey
Eric Greif - Talent Manager
Evan Harting - Co-Founder of Maryland Deathfest
Josh Hogan - Diminished Fifth Records
Matt Jacobson - Relapse Records
Therese Lanz - Ex-Exit Strategy, Kilbourne, Mares of Thrace
Greg Musgrave - Exit Strategy, Phantom Limb
Sacha Laskow - Divinity
Sean Palmertson - Publicist, Sonic Unyon Records and Distro.
Pamela Porosky - Freelance Writer and Photographer, Ex-Gales of Avalon, Sacred Ally
Dan Rozenblum - Thunderdome Touring
Rob Shallcross - Music Engineer
Andy Sneap - Producer
James Stangroom - Freelance Photographer, Calgary
Ryan Taylor - Co-Founder of Maryland Deathfest
Joshua Wood - Co-Host Megawatt Mayhem
Kevin Woron - Co-Host Megawatt Mayhem

September 25
MacEwan Hall

Sodom (band)
Metsatoll
The Devil's Blood
Midnight
Martial Barrage
Divinity
Striker
Mark of Cain

2011: Noctis 4.20
October 1, 2011
October 1
The Distillery

Brutal Truth
Martyr
Acid King
Grave Miasma
Midnight
Samandriel
Atomis
Sub-Atomic Chaos

Vern's Tavern

Midnight Malice
Sons of Otis
Bloated Pig
Shadowblade
Lavagoat
Black Pestilence
Gatekrashor

2012: Noctis V - Baphomiss
September 27, September 28 & September 29, 2012
September 27
The Distillery

The Contortionist
Blood Ceremony
Speedwolf
Epi-Demic
Hoopsnake
Deviant Aerials

Guest Speakers, Panels, and Q&A

Martin Popoff - Brave Words & Bloody Knuckles
Martin Atkins - Author of Tour:Smart
Luc Lemay - Gorguts
Jon Asher - Publicist, Asher Media Relations
Chris Bruni - Profound Lore Records
Adrien Begrand - Journalist
Andy Piller - CEO of Ultimate Music Cruises
Chuck Keller - Ares Kingdom, Ex Order From Chaos
Clennon Aranha - Promoter, CPW Productions
Dan Neild - Gatekrashor
Eric Dieterich - Graphic & Web Designer, Soloman Media
Tomislav Crnkovic - Viathyn, Axe Music
Eric Greif - Talent Manager
Greg Musgrave - Exit Strategy, Phantom Limb
James Stangroom - Freelance Photographer, Calgary
Joel McIver - Author and journalist
Joshua Wood - Co-Host Megawatt Mayhem
Kevin Woron - Co-Host Megawatt Mayhem
Mark Howitt - Archaic North Productions
Sacha Laskow - Divinity
Sarah Kitteringham - Journalist
Susan Bullen - Manager, Kobra and the Lotus

September 28
The Distillery

Pig Destroyer
Manilla Road
Midnight
Psychostick
Kataplexis
Archspire
Phantom Limb
Anciients

September 29
MacEwan Hall

Venom (band)
Agalloch
Grand Magus (band)
Nunslaughter
Black Witchery
Excrementory Grindfuckers
The Order of Chaos
Scythia

References

External links
 Noctis Valkyries Metal Festival Official Website

Heavy metal festivals in Canada
Music festivals in Calgary
Music festivals established in 2007